Ramaroshan (Nepali: रामारोशन ) is a Gaupalika(Nepali: गाउपालिका ; gaupalika) in Achham District in the Sudurpashchim Province of far-western Nepal. 
Ramaroshan has a population of 25166.The land area is 173.33 km2.

It was formed by merging Malatiko, Chafamandu, Shantada, Batulasain, Samroshan, Bhatakatiya and Sutar VDCs.

References

Rural municipalities in Achham District
Rural municipalities of Nepal established in 2017